Don Maitz (born June 10, 1953) is an American science fiction, fantasy, and commercial artist. He has twice won the Hugo Award for Best Professional Artist, science fiction's highest honor for an artist. His peers in the Association of Science Fiction and Fantasy Artists have honored him ten times with a Chesley Award for outstanding achievement, and he has received a Silver Medal of Excellence from the Society of Illustrators.

A native of Plainville, Connecticut, he is a 1975 graduate of the Paier School of Art.  His art has adorned the covers of books by Isaac Asimov, Ray Bradbury, C. J. Cherryh, Stephen King, Gene Wolfe, Michael Moorcock, and Raymond E. Feist, among others.  Two compilations of his work have been published, Dreamquests: The Art of Don Maitz, and First Maitz. He also created the "Captain" character of the Captain Morgan brand of rum.

Maitz resides in Florida with his wife, fantasy novelist and artist Janny Wurts.

Genres
Maitz's work covers the broad spectrum of Fantasy & Science Fiction and even horror. He has also painted an extensive collection of pirates, including the pirate on the labels of Captain Morgan rum.

Published works
Don Maitz has published two books featuring his own works entitled First Maitz and Dreamquests: The Art of Don Maitz.  Friedlander Publishing Group released two 90-card sets, each with five "chase" cards in 1994 and 1996.

Maitz has also been included in the first book of series concentrating on artists who publish in the realm of Fantasy. This book is Fantasy Art Masters: The Best Fantasy and Science Fiction Artists Show How They Work.

First Maitz
First Maitz was published in 1988. A detailed overview of the artist's work, his techniques, inspirations, and sketches from start to finished painting.

Dreamquests: The Art of Don Maitz
Published in 1993, Dreamquests is a collection of Maitz's works. Raymond E. Feist gives the introduction, Maitz gives a few thoughts and then come pages and pages of beautiful images with a glossary at the end to give a title to the image and where it was used - book cover, magazine cover, etc.

Raiding Parties
Raiding Parties is a pirate-themed card game featuring artwork by Maitz on each card.

References

External links
 
 The Collaborative Worlds of Janny Wurtz and Don Maitz
 Book cover collection of Don Maitz
 Raiding Parties
 

American speculative fiction artists
Artists from Florida
Fantasy artists
Hugo Award-winning artists
Living people
People from Plainville, Connecticut
Science fiction artists
World Fantasy Award-winning artists
1953 births